Basketball contests at the 2000 Summer Olympics was the fifteenth appearance of the sport of basketball as an official Olympic medal event. It was held from 16 September 2000 to 1 October 2000. Games took place at the Sydney SuperDome and the Dome in Sydney, New South Wales, Australia. The United States claimed the gold medals in both the men's and women's competitions.

Venues

Medalists

Qualification 
A National Olympic Committee (NOC) may enter up to one men's team with 12 players and up to one women's team with 12 players. The reigning world champions and the host country qualify automatically, as do the winners of the five continental championships, plus the Americas runner-up and four additional berths from Europe in the men's competition, and the second and third place from the Americas tournament plus three additional squads from Europe in the women's competition.

Basketball – Men

Basketball – Women

Format 
 Twelve teams are split into two preliminary round groups of six teams each.
 The top four teams from both groups qualify for the knockout stage. 
 Fifth-placed teams from both groups compete for 9th place in an additional match.
 Sixth-placed teams from both groups compete for 11th place in an additional match.
 In the quarterfinals, the matchups are as follows: A1 vs. B4, A2 vs. B3, A3 vs. B2, and A4 vs. B1.
 From the eliminated teams at the quarterfinals, the loser from A1 vs. B4 competes against the loser from A2 vs. B3 for 5th place in an additional match. The remaining two loser teams compete for 6th place in an additional match.
 The winning teams from the quarterfinals meet in the semifinals as follows: A1/B4 vs. A3/B2 and A2/B3 vs. A4/B1.
 The winning teams from the semifinals contest the gold medal. The losing teams contest the bronze.

Tie-breaking criteria:

 Head to head results
 Goal average (not the goal difference) between the tied teams
 Goal average of the tied teams for all teams in its group

Men's tournament

Championship bracket

Women's tournament

Championship bracket

Final standings

References 

 Official Olympic Report

 
2000
Basketball
2000 in basketball
2000–01 in Australian basketball
International basketball competitions hosted by Australia